Jill Susanne Ritchie  (born March 5, 1974) is an American actress and the younger sister of rapper-singer-songwriter Kid Rock.

Career
Ritchie starred in the 2004 film D.E.B.S. and in Breakin' All the Rules, and had a guest role as Bluth family publicist Jessie in an episode of Arrested Development. She co-starred in the VH1 series I Hate My 30's. She is friends with Liam Kyle Sullivan and she also appeared in his video "Let Me Borrow That Top" as Katelyn (the girl Kelly wants the top from and who was homecoming queen). Ritchie also appeared in the movie Herbie: Fully Loaded, playing Charisma.

Filmography

Film

Television

References

External links

1974 births
Living people
Actresses from Michigan
American film actresses
American television actresses
University of Southern California alumni
People from Romeo, Michigan
21st-century American women